Mauj is a 1943 Bollywood film directed by Nanabhai Bhatt and Babubhai Mistri, starring 
Fearless Nadia as the lead.

References

External links
 

1943 films
1940s Hindi-language films
Indian black-and-white films
Films directed by Babubhai Mistry